The 2020–21 Niagara Purple Eagles men's ice hockey season was the 25th season of play for the program, the 23rd at the Division I level, and the 11th season in the Atlantic Hockey conference. The Purple Eagles represented Niagara University and were coached by Jason Lammers, in his 4th season.

Season
As a result of the ongoing COVID-19 pandemic the entire college ice hockey season was delayed. Because the NCAA had previously announced that all winter sports athletes would retain whatever eligibility they possessed through at least the following year, none of Niagara's players would lose a season of play. However, the NCAA also approved a change in its transfer regulations that would allow players to transfer and play immediately rather than having to sit out a season, as the rules previously required.

Niagara had a difficult start to their season, with the team's defense unable to withstand sustained pressure for most of their games. By mid-January the team was near the bottom of the conference with just 2 wins in 13 games. To make matters worse, the Purple Eagles weren't able to play any games for 6 weeks due to COVID cancellations. When they finally managed to play again they decided to use Chad Veltri as their starting goaltender. In the final two weekends of the regular season the choice appeared to work out as Niagara split both weekends while Veltri recorded the only shutout for the Purple Eagles on the campaign.

Niagara entered the postseason as the 9th seed and needed to beat Mercyhurst to keep their season alive. After the Lakers scored the first two goals of the game it looked like NU would have an early summer but Veltri withstood a barrage of shots from Mercyhurst over the final 38 minutes and allowed Niagara to crawl its way back and win on a late marker from junior transfer Walker Sommer. In the quarterfinals, the Purple Eagles had to face Robert Morris, a team that had won all four meetings to that point. The Colonials won the first game but they needed overtime to do so. In keeping the game close, Veltri game his team an opportunity to win and the sophomore netminder remained hot in game 2 as well; Veltri faced 51 shots over an 80-minute span and the frantic pace appeared to wear on Robert Morris who weren't able to get a single shot on goal in over 7 minutes of play in the second overtime. Instead, it was Niagara who fired 5 shots on goal with the last tying the series at 1-all. Veltri was again front and center for the team in the deciding game, facing 45 shots in regulation. Niagara built a 2-goal lead and held it until just 12 seconds remained in the game, when RMU scored their only goal on the night, allowing Niagara to pull off a huge upset in the conference tournament.

In the semifinals, Niagara had to get past league-leading American International, who had not played a game since the end of January due to their own series of cancellations. Veltri continued to keep the Purple Eagles in contention, stopping everything in the first two periods and giving the team a lead entering the third, but AIC's slumbering offense awoke in the final frame, scored two goals, and ended Niagara's improbable run.

Trevor Poeze and Patrick Pugliese sat out the season.

Departures

Recruiting

Roster
As of October 14, 2020.

Standings

Schedule and results

|-
!colspan=12 style=";" | Regular Season

|-
!colspan=12 style=";" | 

|- align="center" bgcolor="#e0e0e0"
|colspan=12|Niagara Won Series 2–1

Scoring statistics

Goaltending statistics

Rankings

USCHO did not release a poll in week 20.

Awards and honors

References

Niagara Purple Eagles men's ice hockey seasons
Niagara Purple Eagles
Niagara Purple Eagles
Niagara Purple Eagles
2021 in sports in New York (state)
2020 in sports in New York (state)